Agnes World (28 April 1995 – 20 August 2012) was an American-bred, Japanese-trained Thoroughbred racehorse and sire, best known for his performances over sprint distances in Europe. Bred in Kentucky, he was sold for over $1 million as a yearling and exported to Japan. As a juvenile in 1997 he won three of his four races including the Grade III Hakodate Futurity Stakes but was off the course for almost a year after sustaining an injury in early 1998. In 1999 he showed winning form over sprint distances in Japan before being sent to France where he won the Prix de l'Abbaye in October. He remained in training as a five-year-old and again showed his best form in Europe, becoming the first Japanese-trained horse to win a race in the United Kingdom when he won the July Cup. He was retired to stud at the end of the season and stood as a breeding stallion in Japan, Australia and the United Kingdom.

Background
Agnes World was a dark bay or brown horse bred in Kentucky by Calumet Farm. He had a small, irregular white star in the shape of a ">" and two white socks. His sire Danzig, who ran only three times before his career was ended by injury, was a highly successful stallion who sired the winners of more than fifty Grade I/Group One races. His offspring include the champions Chief's Crown, Dayjur and Lure as well as the important stallion Danehill. Agnes World's dam Mysteries failed to win a race but showed high-class form when finishing third to Snow Bride in the Musidora Stakes. As a broodmare she also produced Mysterial, the dam of Dubai Destination.

As a yearling, the colt was sent to the Keeneland July sale and was bought for $1,050,000 by Takao Watanabe. He was exported to Japan and sent into training with Hideyuki Mori. He was ridden in most of his races by Yutaka Take.

Racing career

1997 & 1998: early career
Agnes World began his racing career with a win in a maiden race over 1200 metres at Hakodate Racecourse on 7 June 1997. In July he was stepped up in class for the Grade III Hakodate Futurity Stakes over the same course and distance and won again, beating Saratoga Beauty in a record time of 1:09.8. After the mid-season break, the colt returned to contest Japan's most prestigious race for two-year-olds, the Grade I Asahi Hai Futurity Stakes over 1600 metres at Nakayama Racecourse and finished fourth behind Grass Wonder. On his final start of the year, Agnes World won over 1600 metres on dirt at Kawasaki Racecourse on 27 December.

On his three-year-old debut, Agnes World finished second to Dantsu Sirius in the Grade III Nikkan Sports Sho Shinzan Kinen at Kyoto Racecourse in January, but was subsequently injured and missed the rest of the season.

1999: four-year-old season
After an absence of almost a year, Agnes World returned to finish sixth in the Grade III Garnet Stakes at Nakayama on 18 January and then finished second in a minor stakes race over 1200 metres at Kyoto. In April, over the same course and distance, he finished second to Meiner Love in the Grade III Silk Road Stakes. For his next two races he was moved up to the highest class: he finished fifth to Masa Lucky in the Takamatsunomiya Kinen at Chukyo and eighth behind Air Jihad in the Yasuda Kinen at Tokyo Racecourse. The colt returned to winning form when he was dropped in class for two sprint races at Kokura Racecourse. In July he won the Kitakyushu Tankyori Stakes in a record time of 1:06.5 and in the following month he added a win in the Kokura Nikkei Open.

After his wins at Kokura, Agnes World, accompanied by his stablemate Dojima Muteki, was sent to Europe to be prepared for a run in the Group One Prix de l'Abbaye at Longchamp Racecourse on 3 October. He entered the race without a prep race in Europe and was racing over 1000 metres, a distance he had never previously attempted. The Godolphin colt Bertolini started favourite ahead of Sainte Marine (Prix du Gros Chêne) and Imperial Beauty (World Trophy) with the Japanese duo next in the betting on 6.8/1. The other runners included Keos (Prix de Ris-Orangis, Prix de Seine-et-Oise), Arkadian Hero (Mill Reef Stakes), Black Rock Desert (Prix de Saint-Georges), Mitcham (King's Stand Stakes), Averti (King George Stakes), Sampower Star (Duke of York Stakes) and Yorkies Boy (Palace House Stakes). Agnes World was always among the leaders and went to the front approaching the last 400 metres. He was driven out by Yutaka Take to win by a short neck from Imperial Beauty with Keos a length and half way in third place.

Agnes World returned to Japan for his last two races of 1999. At Kokura in November he recorded his first major win in Japan for sixteen months when he defeated Masa Lucky by half a length in the Grade II CBC Sho. On his final appearance of the season he contested the Sprinters Stakes in December and finished second, beaten a neck by the five-year-old Black Hawk.

2000: five-year-old season
On his first run as a five-year-old Agnes World made his second attempt to win the Takamatsunomiya Kinen and finished third, beaten a neck and the same by King Halo and Divine Light.

In the summer of 2000, the horse was sent to Europe to contest two major sprint races in the United Kingdom. He was again accompanied by Dojima Muteki as well as Air Shakur who was being prepared for a run in the King George VI and Queen Elizabeth Stakes. At Royal Ascot on 20 June, a week after his arrival in Britain, he started a 16/1 outsider in a twenty-three runner field for the King's Stand Stakes and finished second, one and a half lengths behind Nuclear Debate. On 13 July at Newmarket Racecourse, Agnes World started 4/1 favourite for the July Cup over six furlongs. On the eve of the race Masa Matsuda, who had handled the horse's preparation was interviewed by The Guardian and said "at three and four years, he was good at home when he galloped, but when he got to the races he was like a child, because he was very nervous. All the time he was biting me or kicking me. But now he is like an adult. He is more relaxed when he goes racing, and is getting better all the time". Agnes World's main rivals in the betting were Lincoln Dancer (Sandy Lane Stakes), Primo Valentino (Middle Park Stakes), Lend A Hand (Gran Criterium, Hungerford Stakes, Duke of York Stakes), Monashee Mountain (Tetrarch Stakes) and Pipalong (Palace House Stakes). Yutaka Take tracked the leaders as Primo Valentino made the running before making his challenge in the last quarter mile. Lincoln Dancer took the lead a furlong out, but Agnes World overhauled the leader in the final strides to win by a short head, with Pipalong another short head away in third. His victory was the first Group One victory in Britain for a horse trained in Japan. Commenting through an interpreter, Take said "My horse felt good before the race so I felt confident. I always thought he would be good enough. It is a great pleasure for me to win and I am very happy". The JRA spokesman Yukio Nakayama said "It was 130 years ago that the British people introduced horseracing to Japan. We have imported many, many horses from here, and now we have won a race here".

Agnes World returned to Japan for the Sprinters' Stakes on 1 October in which he finished strongly to take second, one and a half lengths behind the front-running 257/1 outsider Daitaku Yamato. In November, the horse was sent to the United States to contest the Breeders' Cup Sprint at Churchill Downs. Racing on dirt for the first time since December 1997 he never looked likely to win and finished eighth of the fourteen runners behind Kona Gold.

Stud record
Agnes World was retired from racing to become a breeding stallion. He began his stud career in Japan and later stood in Europe at the Dalham Hall Stud as well as being shuttled to Australia for the Southern hemisphere breeding season. The most successful of his offspring has been the Australian-bred Wonderful World, who won the Caulfield Guineas in 2006. His last reported foals were born in 2006. Agnes World died in Japan on 20 August 2012.

Pedigree

Agnes World was inbred 2 x 4 to Northern Dancer, meaning that this stallion appears in both the second and fourth generations of his pedigree.

References

1995 racehorse births
2012 racehorse deaths
Racehorses bred in Kentucky
Racehorses trained in Japan
Thoroughbred family 6-b